The Himachal Pradesh women's cricket team is a women's cricket team that represents the Indian state of Himachal Pradesh. The team competes in the Women's Senior One Day Trophy and the Women's Senior T20 Trophy.

Current squad

Kashish Verma
Shivani Singh (wk)
Harleen Deol (c)
Neena Choudhary
Shalini Kundal
Chitra Jamwal
Monika Devi
Vandana Rana
Tanuja Kanwar
Sushma Verma (wk)
Renuka Singh
Susmita Kumari
Preeti Kahlon
Anisha Ansari
Vasuvi Fishta

See also
 Himachal Pradesh cricket team

References

Cricket in Himachal Pradesh
Women's cricket teams in India